The 1989–90 Bulgarian Cup was the 50th season of the Bulgarian Cup. Sliven won the competition for first time, beating CSKA Sofia 2–0 in the final at the Hristo Botev Stadium in Gabrovo.

First round

|-
!colspan=5 style="background-color:#D0F0C0;" |1989

|}

Second round
In this round include the three teams, who participated in the European tournaments (CSKA, Levski and Chernomorets)

|-
!colspan=5 style="background-color:#D0F0C0;" |14 / 21 February 1990

|-
!colspan=5 style="background-color:#D0F0C0;" |7 / 21 March 1990

|}

Quarter-finals

|-
!colspan=5 style="background-color:#D0F0C0;" |27 March / 11 April 1990

|}

Semi-finals

|-
!colspan=5 style="background-color:#D0F0C0;" |25 April / 16 May 1990

|}

Final

Details

References

1989-90
1989–90 domestic association football cups
Cup